The Bees ("Killer Bees") is a 1978 Mexican horror film about South American bees imported to the USA, where they wreak havoc.

Cast
John Saxon - John Norman 
Angel Tompkins - Sandra Miller 
John Carradine - Dr. Sigmund Hummel 
Claudio Brook - Dr. Miller 
Alicia Encinas - Alicia
Roger Cudney - Blankeley

Production
The film was originally to be written and directed by Jack Hill but he was replaced by the producer during filming. Warner Bros. reputedly paid New World Pictures a large amount for the film's release to be delayed until after that of The Swarm (1978).

It was one of several Roger Corman-financed films starring John Saxon.

References

External links

1970s exploitation films
English-language Mexican films
Natural horror films
Fictional bees
Films about bees
1978 films
1978 horror films
New World Pictures films
1970s English-language films